The suburb name was being used unofficially from at least the 1880s, but East Perth wasn't officially approved as a bounded suburb until 1954.

See also 
 List of streets in Perth
 List of streets and paths in Kings Park
 List of streets in West Perth
 List of streets in Crawley and Nedlands
 List of streets in Bayswater, Western Australia
List of streets in Kardinya, Western Australia

References 

 
East Perth
East Perth streets
East Perth